The Nagpur–Amla Passenger is a Passenger train belonging to Central Railway zone that runs between  and . It is currently being operated with 51293/51294 train numbers on a daily basis.

Average speed and frequency 

The 51293/Nagpur–Amla Passenger runs with an average speed of 38 km/h and completes 168 km in 4h 25m.
The 51294/Amla–Nagpur Passenger runs with an average speed of 35 km/h and completes 168 km in 4h 45m.

Route and halts 

The important halts of the train are:

Coach composite 

The train has standard ICF rakes with max speed of 110 kmph. The train consists of 9 coaches:

 7 General Unreserved
 2 Seating cum Luggage Rake

Traction

Both trains are hauled by an Ajni Loco Shed-based WAP-7 or Kalyan Loco Shed-based WCAM-3 electric locomotive from Amla to Nagpur and vice versa.

Rake sharing

The train shares its rake with 51239/51240 Amla–Betul Passenger and 51253/51254 Amla–Chhindwara Passenger.

See also 

 Amla Junction railway station
 Nagpur Junction railway station
 Amla–Betul Passenger
 Amla–Chhindwara Passenger

Notes

References

External links 

 51293/Nagpur–Amla Passenger India Rail Info
 51294/Amla–Nagpur Passenger India Rail Info

Rail transport in Maharashtra
Rail transport in Madhya Pradesh
Slow and fast passenger trains in India
Transport in Nagpur